The 1993 McDonald's All-American Boys Game was an All-star basketball game played on Friday, April 2, 1993 at the Mid-South Coliseum in Memphis, Tennessee. The game's rosters featured the best and most highly recruited high school boys graduating in 1993. The game was the 16th annual version of the McDonald's All-American Game first played in 1978.

1993 game
The game was telecast live by CBS. Rashard Griffith was selected as a McDonald's All-American but did not play in the game because of the NCAA limit of 2 all-star games: having already played in the Roundball Classic and the Illinois-US All-Stars game, he was unable to participate in the McDonald's event. The Mid-South Coliseum was sold out for the event: the top prospects of the teams were big men Rasheed Wallace and Darnell Robinson. The MVP title was awarded to two players, Jacque Vaughn for the West team and Jerry Stackhouse for the East. Vaughn was noted for his pass-first style of play and broke the assist record with 13 (the record still stands as of 2018); on the other hand, Stackhouse shown his finishing ability and scored 27 points, becoming the game's top scorer. Other players who starred were Darnell Robinson (19 points/10 rebounds), Charles O'Bannon (19 points), Jerald Honeycutt (14), Keith Booth (15) and Dontonio Wingfield who also recorded a double-double with 13 points and 13 rebounds. Rasheed Wallace fouled out after scoring 9 points. Of the 22 players, 10 went on to play at least 1 game in the NBA.

East roster

West roster

Coaches
The East team was coached by:
 Head Coach Julius Prezelski of Forest City High School (Forest City, Pennsylvania)

The West team was coached by:
 Head Coach Charles Ripley of Parkview High School (Little Rock, Arkansas)

All-American Week

Schedule 
 Thursday, April 1: Coca-Cola JamFest
 Slam Dunk Contest 
 Three-Point Shoot-out
 Friday, April 2: 16th Annual Boys All-American Game

The Coca-Cola JamFest is a skills-competition evening featuring basketball players who demonstrate their skills in two crowd-entertaining ways.  The slam dunk contest was first held in 1987, and a 3-point shooting challenge was added in 1989.

Contest winners 
 The 1993 Slam Dunk contest was won by Jerry Stackhouse.
 The 1993 3-point shoot-out was won by Chris Kingsbury.

References

External links
McDonald's All-American on the web
McDonald's All-American all-time rosters
McDonald's All-American rosters at Basketball-Reference.com
Game stats at Realgm.com

1992–93 in American basketball
1993
1993 in sports in Tennessee
Basketball in Tennessee